Robert McCrindle (28 September 1869 – ?) was a Scottish footballer who played at centre-half for Burslem Port Vale and Luton Town in the 1890s. He played 183 games for Burslem Port Vale, scoring six goals, however 72 of these games were friendlies. He received a call-up to the Scotland national side in 1899, but was unable to play the game due to a fixture clash.

Club career
McCrindle joined Burslem Port Vale in September 1889. A firm first team choice, he was a member of the sides that shared the North Staffordshire Charity Challenge Cup in 1891 and won the Staffordshire Charity Cup in 1892. He featured in 20 Football League Second Division games in the 1892–93 season – the inaugural season of the division. He was an ever-present during the 1893–94 season, but left the Athletic Ground in the summer of 1894, and moved on to Luton Town.

International career
McCrindle was selected to play for his native Scotland in November 1889, however due to a fixture clash could not turn up for the game.

Career statistics
Source:

Honours
Burslem Port Vale
North Staffordshire Charity Challenge Cup: 1891 (shared)
Staffordshire Charity Cup: 1892

References

Scottish footballers
Association football midfielders
Port Vale F.C. players
Luton Town F.C. players
Midland Football League players
English Football League players
1869 births
Year of death missing